The Rumpler C.III (factory designation 6A 5) was a biplane military reconnaissance aircraft built in Germany during World War I.

Development

It was a development of the Rumpler C.I design incorporating many aerodynamic refinements, including wing planform, airfoil section, and horn-balanced ailerons, revised empennage, and new rear fuselage decking with compound curves. This latter feature was later removed and replaced with a simplified structure, at which point the factory designation was changed to 6A 6. Performance was improved over that of the C.I, and the C.III was  selected for limited production, thought to be about 75 aircraft. The Frontbestand table of C-type aircraft at the front shows a maximum of 42 C.III aircraft at the front on 28 February 1917. With the introduction of the more powerful Rumpler C.IV based on a refined C.III airframe, the number of operational C.III aircraft at the front dropped rapidly and by the autumn of 1917 only one was at the front. The C.III was a qualified success, but its design served mainly as a stepping stone to the further refined C.IV.

Specifications (C.III)

Notes

References

 

 
 
 

1910s German military reconnaissance aircraft
C.III
Single-engined tractor aircraft
Biplanes
Aircraft first flown in 1916